This is a list of professional sports leagues.

A sports league is a professional body that governs the competition of its teams. They make the rules for competition and behavior and disciplines its members as necessary. This is done through a structure that varies by league. Some are made up of a board of governors that have a commissioner or president, while others are single entity organizations where the league owns the franchises and therefore does not have a board of governors.

This list attempts to show those sports leagues for which all players and teams are paid to play. In other words, these players can be considered to play their chosen sport as their profession. Some leagues do not pay well enough to allow players to use them as their primary or only source of income, but because the players are paid, it is still considered professional, or semi-professional. As such, some leagues listed here may not be fully professional.

Auto racing
Arena Racing USA
American Hot Rod Association
Asian Le Mans Series
British Touring Car Championship
Copa Truck
Deutsche Tourenwagen Masters (German Touring Car Masters)
D1 Grand Prix
European Le Mans Series
Fédération Internationale de l'Automobile (FIA)
Fédération Internationale de Motocyclisme (FIM)
Formula One
Formula D
Formula E
Fórmula Truck
Blancpain GT Series Sprint Cup 
Grand-Am Road Racing
IMSA
International Hot Rod Association (IHRA)
INDYCAR
Lucas Oil Off-Road Racing
MotoGP
NASCAR (National Association for Stock Car Auto Racing)
National Hot Rod Association (NHRA)
Stock Car Brasil
Super GT / Japan Automobile Federation
TC 2000 Championship
Top Race V6
Turismo Carretera
Supercars Championship (Australia)
FIA World Endurance Championship
World Rally Championship (WRC)
World Touring Car Cup

Badminton
 
National Badminton League

Premier Badminton League

Indonesian League (badminton)
Europe Cup (badminton)

Bandy

 Bandyliiga
 Suomi-sarja

 Russian Bandy Super League
 Russian Bandy Supreme League

 Elitserien
 Allsvenskan
 International
 Bandy World Cup
 Bandy World Cup Women

Baseball

Northern Hemisphere Summer

Americas
Major League Baseball:
American League
National League
Minor League Baseball:
 Triple-A:
 International League
 Pacific Coast League
 Double-A:
 Eastern League
 Southern League
 Texas League
High-A:
 Midwest League
 Northwest League
 South Atlantic League
Single-A:
 California League
 Carolina League
 Florida State League
Rookie:
 Arizona Complex League
 Florida Complex League
 Dominican Summer League
Off-season leagues:
 Arizona Fall League
 Liga de Béisbol Profesional Roberto Clemente
 Cuban National Series
 Dominican Summer League 
 Venezuelan Professional Baseball League
 Independent baseball leagues:
 MLB Partner Leagues:
 American Association
 Atlantic League
 Frontier League
 Pioneer League
 Other leagues:
 Empire Professional Baseball League
 Pecos League
 United Shore Professional Baseball League

 Mexican League
 Mexican Pacific League
 Liga Invernal Veracruzana
 Mexican Academy League

Argentine Baseball League

Asia-Pacific

 Nippon Professional Baseball (NPB)
 Major Leagues:
 Central League
 Pacific League
 Minor Leagues:
 Eastern League
 Western League
 Administered by BFJ:
 Intercity baseball tournament (officially amateur but contains professional teams)
 Industrial Baseball League (officially amateur but contains professional teams)
 All Japan Club Baseball Championship (officially amateur but contains professional teams)
 Independent:
 Baseball Challenge League
 Japan Women's Baseball League
 Kansai Independent Baseball League - 2nd Generation
 Shikoku Island League Plus

 Major League:
 KBO League
 Minor League:
 KBO Futures League

China National Baseball League

 Taiwan
 Major League:
 Chinese Professional Baseball League
 Minor League:
 Chinese Professional Baseball League, Division 2 
 Independent League:
Taiwan Baseball Summer League/Popcorn League

Philippine Baseball League

Europe

 Italian Baseball League (legally amateur)

 Irish Baseball League

 Honkbal Hoofdklasse
 Honkbal Overgangsklasse
 Honkbal Rookie League

 Czech Baseball Extraliga (officially semi-professional but contains several professional teams)
 Ceskomoravská

 Division Élite (officially semi-professional but contains several professional teams)

 Baseball-Bundesliga (officially semi-professional but contains several professional teams)

 División de Honor de Béisbol (officially semi-professional but contains several professional teams)

Elitserien (baseball)

Ekstraliga Baseball (semi-professional)

Portuguese Atlantic Baseball League (semi-professional)

Turkish Baseball League (semi-professional)

Northern Hemisphere Winter

Americas
 
 Liga Argentina de Béisbol

 Liga Colombiana de Béisbol Profesional

 Liga Aqualectra

 Liga de Béisbol Profesional de la República Dominicana

 Liga Invernal Veracruzana
 Liga Mexicana del Pacífico

 La Liga Nicaragüense de Beisbol Profesional

 Probeis

 Liga de Béisbol Profesional Roberto Clemente

 Arizona Fall League

 Liga Venezolana de Béisbol Profesional
 Liga Paralela de Béisbol en Venezuela

Asia-Pacific
,  and 
 Australian Baseball League 
 Greater Brisbane League

,  and 
 Asia Winter Baseball League 
 Miyazaki Phoenix League

Basketball

Bowling
Professional Bowlers Association

Boxing
Major promotions
 Top Rank Boxing
 Golden Boy Promotions
 Don King Promotions
 DiBella Entertainment
 Sauerland Events
 Matchroom Boxing

Major sanctioning bodies

 World Boxing Association (WBA)
 World Boxing Council (WBC)
 International Boxing Federation (IBF)
 World Boxing Organization (WBO)
 The Ring magazine (unofficial sanctioning body)

Super Boxing League
 STAR Boxing Panch

Chess

Professional Chess Association of the Philippines

Cricket
 International
Euro T20 Slam
East Africa Premier League
World Cricket League Africa Region

Africa

 Momentum One Day Cup
 CSA Provincial Competitions
 Mzansi Super League
 Sunfoil Series

 Logan Cup
 Pro50 Championship
 Stanbic Bank 20 Series

North America
Canada
 Global T20 Canada
United States 
 Major League Cricket 
West Indies
 Caribbean Premier League
 Professional Cricket League
 Regional Super50

Asia

Shpageeza Cricket League

 Bangladesh Premier League
 National Cricket League
Bangladesh Cricket League
 Dhaka Premier Division Cricket League

 Indian Premier League
 Ranji Trophy
 Duleep Trophy
 Deodhar Trophy
 Irani Cup
 Karnataka Premier League
 Tamil Nadu Premier League
 Vijay Hazare Trophy
 T20 Mumbai League

 Pakistan Super League
 Quaid-e-Azam Trophy
 Pakistan Cup
 Kashmir Premier League
 Pakistan Women's T20 League
 Pakistan Champions Cricket League
 Pakistan Junior League

 Sri Lanka Premier League
 Premier Limited Overs Tournament
 Premier Trophy

Everest Premier League
Dhangadhi Premier League
Pokhara Premier League

Europe

 County Championship
 Royal London One-Day Cup
 T20 Blast
 Women's Cricket Super League
 The Hundred (cricket)

Murgitroyd Twenty20
Regional Pro Series

Dutch Twenty20 Cup

Inter-Provincial Trophy

Oceania

 Sheffield Shield
 Marsh One-Day Cup
 Big Bash League
 Women's Big Bash League

 Plunket Shield
 Super Smash
 State League

Curling
World Curling Tour

Cycling

 National Bicycle League (BMX)
 American Bicycle Association (BMX)

 International Cycling League
 Pro Cycle Cycling 

 Coppa Italia di ciclismo (the Italian Road Cycling Cup)
 International
 UCI World Tour

Competitive eating
Major League Eating

 Gridiron football: American football, Indoor American football, Arena football, Canadian football, and Flag football 

Americas

 National Football League
 XFL
 United States Football League
 Gridiron Developmental Football League
 Rivals Professional Football League
 Empire Football League (semi-professional)
 New England Football League (semi-professional)
 Pacific Northwest Football League (semi-professional)
 Women's Football Alliance
 Legends Football League
 United States Women's Football League
 Indoor: 
Arena Football League
Indoor Football League
Champions Indoor Football
American West Football Conference
National Arena League
American Arena League
Flag football
American Flag Football League

Superliga Nacional de Futebol Americano

 Canadian Football League
 Western Women's Canadian Football League
 Maritime Women's Football League

 Liga de Fútbol Americano Profesional
 Fútbol Americano de México

Europe

European League of Football

 Austrian Football League

Belgian Football League

Croatian League of American Football

Czech League of American Football (semi-professional)

National Ligaen

Vaahteraliiga

Ligue Élite de Football Américain

 German Football League and German Football League 2

Hungarian American Football League

American Football Ireland

Israel Football League

Italian Football League

Premier League

 Polish American Football League (semi-professional)
 Liga Futbolu Amerykańskiego (semi-professional)

Liga Portuguesa de Futebol Americano

Russian American Football Championship
Eastern European Super League

Slovak Football League

Slovenian Football League

Liga Nacional de Fútbol Americano

Superserien (semi-professional)

Nationalliga A

Türkiye Korumalı Futbol Ligi

BAFA National Leagues

Asia

Chinese National Football League
China Arena Football League

 Elite Football League of India

 X-League

Oceania

Australian Gridiron League

Football: Association football

Football: Australian rules football

Asia
Asian Australian Football Championships

Europe
 Euro Cup (AFL)
 AFL Europe Championship

Oceania

 Australian Football League
 AFL Women's
 South Australian National Football League
 Victorian Football League
 West Australian Football League

International
 Australian Football International Cup

Football: Beach Soccer

Ukrainian Beach Soccer Premier League
 International
Euro Winners Cup
Women's Euro Winners Cup
Copa Libertadores de Beach Soccer

Football: Futsal

Austrian Futsal Liga

 Argentine División de Honor de Futsal

Belarusian Futsal Premier League

Liga Nacional de Futsal

Premier Futsal League of Bosnia and Herzegovina

Czech Futsal First League

Chinese Futsal League

Futsal-Regionalliga Süd
Futsal-Bayernliga

Championnat de France de Futsal

 Futsal Club Championship

 Indonesia Pro Futsal League

Israeli Futsal League

 Iranian Futsal Super League

 Serie A1

Latvian Futsal Premier League

Malaysia Premier Futsal League
Malaysia Premier Futsal League (Women)

Myanmar Futsal League

 Kyrgyzstan Futsal League

 F.League

 FK-League

Serbian Prva Futsal Liga

Ekstraklasa (futsal)

 Liga Portuguesa de Futsal

 Primera División de Futsal

Swedish Futsal League

Swiss Futsal Championship

 Russian Futsal Super League
 Russian Women's Futsal Super League

 Futsal Thai League

 Turkish Futsal League

 Uzbekistan Futsal League

Professional Futsal League
Major League Futsal

National Futsal Series
National Futsal League
Scottish Futsal League

Vietnam Futsal League

Extra-Liga
International
 UEFA Futsal Champions League
 Asian Premier Futsal Championship
 AFC Futsal Club Championship
 Copa Libertadores de Futsal
 CONCACAF Futsal Club Championship
 Intercontinental Futsal Cup

Football: Indoor soccer

Major Arena Soccer League
Major Arena Soccer League 2
Premier Arena Soccer League
Western Indoor Soccer League
Arena Soccer League

Fencing
 American Fencing League

Field hockey

Asia
: Hockey India League
: Malaysia Hockey League
: Pakistan Hockey League

Europe
 Europe: Euro Hockey League
 Europe: Women's Euro Hockey League
: Men's Hoofdklasse Hockey
: Feldhockey Bundesliga (Men's field hockey)
: Men's Belgian Hockey League

Australia
: Hockey One

Golf

Men's

Top-level tours
 PGA Tour (United States)
 PGA European Tour
 Japan Golf Tour
 Asian Tour (Asia outside Japan)
 PGA Tour of Australasia (Australia and New Zealand)
 Sunshine Tour (southern Africa, mainly South Africa)
 OneAsia Tour (joint venture between the Japan, Australasia, China, and Korean tours)
 Professional Golf Tour of India
 LIV Golf

Senior tours
 PGA Tour Champions (United States)
 European Senior Tour

Developmental tours
 Korn Ferry Tour (second-tier US tour, operated by the PGA Tour)
 Challenge Tour (second-tier European tour)
 Japan Challenge Tour (second-tier Japanese tour)
 PGA Tour Canada (feeds to the Web.com Tour)
 PGA Tour China (feeds to the Web.com Tour)
 PGA Tour Latinoamérica (feeds to the Web.com Tour)
 Satellite Tours, four third-level tours recognised by the European Tour:
 Alps Tour (jointly sanctioned by the golf associations of Austria, France, Italy, Morocco and Switzerland)
 Pro Golf Tour (based in Germany)
 Nordic Golf League (operating in the Nordic countries)
 Swedish Golf Tour (men's version is a Swedish tour included in the Nordic League competition)
 PGA EuroPro Tour (based in the UK)
 Gateway Tour (third-tier US tour)
 Fuzion Minor League Golf Tour (low cost fourth-tier US tour)
 Swing Thought Tour (third-tier US tour)

Women's

Top-level tours
 LPGA (Ladies Professional Golf Association; United States)
 LPGA of Japan Tour
 Ladies European Tour
 LPGA of Korea Tour (South Korea)
 Ladies Asian Golf Tour (Asia outside Japan and Korea)
 ALPG Tour (Australia)

Senior tours
 Legends Tour (United States)

Developmental tours
 Epson Tour (second-tier US tour, operated by the LPGA)
 Ladies European Tour Access Series, LETAS, the official feeder tour to the Ladies European Tour, has been formed to give players not part of a major tour an opportunity to compete and progress on to the Ladies European Tour.
 Step Up Tour (second-tier Japanese tour, operated by the LPGA of Japan)
 Swedish Golf Tour (women's version is a second-tier tour in Sweden, feeding to the Ladies European Tour)

Handball
  Angola Men's Handball League
  Angola Women's Handball League
  Handball League Australia
  Handball Liga Austria
  Algerian Handball Championship
  Algerian Women's Handball Championship
  Belarusian Men's Handball Championship
  Belarusian Women's Handball Championship
  Belgian First Division (men's handball)
  Belgian First Division (women's handball)
  Bulgarian GHR A
  Czech Handball Extraliga
  Croatian Premier Handball League
  Croatian First League (women's handball)
  Danish Men's Handball League
  Danish Women's Handball League
  Finnish Handball League
  Nemzeti Bajnokság I (men's handball)
  Nemzeti Bajnokság I (women's handball)
  Indian Premier Handball League
  Premier Handball League
  Serbian Handball Super League
  Serbian Super League of Handball for Women
  Slovenská hadzanárska extraliga
  Slovenian First League (men's handball)
  Slovenian First League (women's handball)
  Handbollsligan
  Svensk handbollselit
  Úrvalsdeild karla (handball)
  Úrvalsdeild kvenna (handball)
  Swiss Handball League
  SPAR Premium League
  Handball-Bundesliga
  2. Handball-Bundesliga
  DHB-Pokal
  Handball-Bundesliga (women)
  Greek Men's Handball Championship
  Greek Women's Handball Championship
  Serie A (men's handball)
  Serie A1 (women's handball)
  Ligat Ha'Al (handball)
  Championnat de France de handball
  Championnat de France de handball féminin
  Liga ASOBAL
  División de Plata de Balonmano
  División de Honor Femenina de Balonmano
  Campeonato Nacional de Andebol Masculino Andebol 1
  1ª Divisão de Andebol Feminino
  Japan Handball League
  Handball Korea League
  Macedonian Handball Super League
  Montenegrin First League of Men's Handball
  Montenegrin First League of Women's Handball
  Polish Superliga (men's handball)
  Polish Women's Superliga (women's handball)
  Liga Națională (men's handball)
  Divizia A1 (men's volleyball)
  Liga Națională (women's handball)
  Divizia A (women's handball)
  Russian Handball Super League
  Russian Women's Handball Super League
  Liga Națională (men's handball)
  Liga Națională (women's handball)
  Tunisian Handball League
  Tunisian Women's Handball League
  Turkish Handball Super League
  Turkish Women's Handball Super League
  Ukrainian Men's Handball Super League
  Ukrainian Women's Handball Super League
 Baltic Handball League
 
 BENE-League Handball
 SEHA League (Southeast Europe)
 Women Handball International League
 Asian Club League Handball Championship
 Asian Women's Club League Handball Championship
 African Women's Handball Champions League
 African Handball Cup Winners' Cup
 EHF European League
 EHF European Cup
 Women's EHF European Cup
 North American and Caribbean Senior Club Championship
 South and Central American Men's Club Handball Championship
 South and Central American Women's Club Handball Championship
 Oceania Handball Champions Cup
 Oceania Women's Handball Champions Cup
 IHF Super Globe
 IHF Women's Super Globe

Ice hockey

North America
 and 
 National Hockey League (major)
 American Hockey League (high minor)
 ECHL (mid-minor)
 Premier Hockey Federation (women's major)

 only
 Ligue Nord-Américaine de Hockey (low minor)
 Big 6 Hockey League (low minor)

 only
 Southern Professional Hockey League (low minor)
 Federal Prospects Hockey League (low minor)

Liga Mexicana Élite de Hockey (semi-professional)

Asia
 Asia League Ice Hockey

 Kazakhstan Hockey Championship

Mongolia Hockey League

Chinese Taipei Ice Hockey League

Hong Kong Ice Hockey League

Israeli League (ice hockey)

Europe

Champions Hockey League
European Women's Hockey League
IIHF Continental Cup
IIHF European Women's Champions Cup

 ICE Hockey League
 Austrian National League

 Alps Hockey League

  
Baltic Hockey League

, 
 BeNe League

 Belarusian Extraleague

Bulgarian Hockey League

 
Celtic League Cup

 Czech Extraliga
 1st Czech Republic Hockey League
 2nd Czech Republic Hockey League

 Croatian Ice Hockey League

Serbian Hockey League

 Metal Ligaen
 Danish Division 1

 Ligue Magnus
 FFHG Division 1

 Liiga
 Mestis
 Suomi-sarja
 2. Divisioona
 3. Divisioona
 Naisten Liiga
 Naisten Mestis

 Deutsche Eishockey Liga
 DEL2
 Oberliga

,  and 
 Erste Liga (ice hockey)

 Latvian Hockey Higher League

 Lithuania Hockey League

 Meistriliiga

 and 
 Eredivisie

 GET-ligaen
 Norwegian First Division (ice hockey)
 Norwegian Second Division (ice hockey)

 Italian Hockey League - Serie A
 Italian Hockey League - Serie B
 Italian Hockey League - Serie C

 Polska Hokej Liga

Romanian Hockey League

 Kontinental Hockey League (major)

 only
 Russian Major League (high minor)
 Russian Hockey League (low minor)
 Russian Women's Hockey League

, 
 Slovak Extraliga
 Slovak 1.Liga
 Slovak 2. Liga

Slovenian Ice Hockey League

 National League
 Swiss League
 MySports League
 Swiss 1. Liga
 Swiss 2. Liga

 Swedish Hockey League
 HockeyAllsvenskan
 Hockeyettan
 Hockeytvåan
 Swedish Women's Hockey League
 Damettan
 Damtvåan

 Turkish Ice Hockey Super League
 Turkish Ice Hockey First League
 Turkish Women's Ice Hockey League

 Ukrainian Hockey League

(and )
 Elite Ice Hockey League
 English Premier Ice Hockey League
 National Ice Hockey League
 Scottish National League
 Northern League (ice hockey, 2005–)

Oceania
 
 Australian Ice Hockey League (semi-pro)
East Coast Super League

 
New Zealand Ice Hockey League (amateur)

Indoor hockey
Men's EuroHockey Indoor Club Cup
Women's EuroHockey Indoor Club Cup

Inline hockey
 Major League Roller Hockey (United States)
 Professional Inline Hockey Association (United States)
 Portuguese Roller Hockey First Division (Portugal)
 Roller Hockey Premier League (UK)

Roller hockey (quad)/Rink hockey 
 
OK Liga
Rink Hockey Euroleague
World Skate Europe Cup
Continental Cup (rink hockey)
Rink Hockey European Female League
Roller Hockey Intercontinental Cup
Roller Hockey Women's Intercontinental Cup

Kabaddi
International Tournaments
 Kabaddi World Cup
 Kabaddi Masters Series
 World Kabaddi League (and )

Kabaddi Leagues

Pro Kabaddi League
Women's Kabaddi Challenge()
Super Kabaddi League (Pakistan) - Pakistan's first Kabaddi League. Season 01 took place in April–May 2018 and was hailed as a success.

 Kho kho 

 Ultimate Kho Kho

Kickboxing
 Glory
 K-1
 Kunlun Fight
 Wu Lin Feng

Korfball
Korfball Europa Cup
Korfball Europa Shield

Lacrosse

Box / Indoor lacrosse
 and 
 NLL – National Lacrosse League (United States and Canada) [major]
 WLA – Western Lacrosse Association (Canada) [high minor]
 MSL – Major Series Lacrosse (Canada) [high minor]
 ALL – Arena Lacrosse League (Canada) [mid minor]

Field lacrosse
 PLL – Premier Lacrosse League (United States) [major]
 Merged with the competing Major League Lacrosse in December 2020, with the merged league operating as the PLL.
 ALL - American Lacrosse League (United States) [low minor/club]
 UWLX - United Women's Lacrosse League (United States)
 WPLL - Women's Professional Lacrosse League (United States)
 AUL - Athletes Unlimited Lacrosse
 Europe
 Ken Galluccio Cup

Mixed martial arts

 : Ultimate Fighting Championship (Premier American/International Organization)
 : Bellator MMA (Second Tier American Organization)
 : Professional Fighters League (Second Tier American Organization)
: Legacy Fighting Alliance (Minor American Organization)
 : King of the Cage (Minor American Organization)
 : Shark Fights (Minor American Organization)
 : Titan Fighting Championships (Minor American Organization)
 : Tachi Palace Fights (Minor American Organization)
 : Invicta Fighting Championships (Minor American Organization)
  Japan: Rizin FF (Premier Japanese Organization)
  Japan: Shooto (Second Tier Japanese Organization)
  Japan: Pancrase (Second Tier Japanese Organization)
  Japan: DEEP (Minor Japanese Organization)
  Japan: ZST (Minor Japanese Organization)
  Japan: RisingOn (Minor Japanese Organization)
  South Korea: ROAD Fighting Championship (Premier Korean Organization)
  South Korea: TOP Fighting Championship (Second Tier Korean Organization)
  Brazil: Jungle Fight (Premier Brazilian Organization)
 Brazil: Shooto Brasil (Second Tier Brazilian Organization)
 Russia: Absolute Championship Akhmat (Premier Russian-based Organization) Russia: Fight Nights Global (Premier Russian-based Organization) Russia: M-1 Global (Second Tier Russian-based Organization)
 Poland: Konfrontacja Sztuk Walki (Premier Polish-based Organization)
  Canada: Maximum Fighting Championship (Premier Canadian Organization)
  England: BAMMA (Premier English Organization)
  Netherlands: United Glory (Premier Dutch Organization)
  Poland: Konfrontacja Sztuk Walki (Premier Polish Organization)
  Finland: Finnfight (Premier Finish Organization)
  China: Kunlun Fight (Premier Chinese Organization)
  Singapore: ONE Championship (Premier Singaporean Organization)
  Hong Kong: Legend Fighting Championship (Premier Hong Konger Organization)
  Philippines: Universal Reality Combat Championship (Premier Filipino Organization'')
  India: Super Fight League

Motorcycle racing
 Grand Prix motorcycle racing (MotoGP)
 Superbike World Championship (SBK)
 AMA Superbike Championship
 AMA Supercross Championship

Netball
  – Suncorp Super Netball, Australian Netball League
  – ANZ Premiership
  – Netball Superleague
  – Netball Super League (Singapore)

Pesäpallo
:
Superpesis

Shooting
 
Bundesliga (shooting)

Speedway
 : 
 Danish Speedway League
 :
 Speedway Ekstraliga
 :
 Elitserien
 Allsvenskan
 :
 Elite League
 Premier League
 National League

Professional wrestling

United States
 WWE (also known as World Wrestling Entertainment)
 All Elite Wrestling
 Ring of Honor – shares ownership with All Elite Wrestling, but remains a separate legal entity
 Impact Wrestling (formerly Total Nonstop Action Wrestling and Global Force Wrestling)
 Game Changer Wrestling
 Major League Wrestling
Japan
 New Japan Pro-Wrestling
 All Japan Pro Wrestling
 DDT Pro-Wrestling
 Pro Wrestling Noah
Mexico
 Consejo Mundial de Lucha Libre
 Lucha Libre AAA Worldwide

Racquetball
 International Racquetball Tour
 Ladies Professional Racquetball Tour

Roll Ball
 
Maha Roll Ball League

 Roll Ball One

 Pro Roll Ball One

 Roll Ball League

Rugby league

Americas
  North American Rugby League

Europe

  Super League
  RFL Championship
  RFL League 1
  RFL Women's Super League
  Elite One Championship
  Elite Two Championship

Oceania
 
   National Rugby League
   Canterbury Cup NSW
   Queensland Cup
   NSW Challenge Cup
   Ron Massey Cup (semi-professional)
  Group 7 Rugby League (semi-professional)
  NZ National Competition
  Papua New Guinea National Rugby League (semi-professional)
  NRL Women's Premiership
  QRL Women's Premiership

Rugby union

Intercontinental
   United Rugby Championship

Africa
  Currie Cup Premier Division
 Currie Cup First Division
  Kenya Cup (semi-professional)
  Top 20 (semi-professional)

Americas
  Major League Rugby
  Súper Liga Americana de Rugby

Asia-Pacific
  Super Rugby Pacific
  NPC
 
 Japan Rugby League One - Division 1
 Japan Rugby League One - Division 2
 Japan Rugby League One - Division 3 (semi-professional)
  Sri Lanka Rugby Championship (semi-professional)

Europe
  Premiership Rugby
  Premiership Rugby Shield
   RFU Championship
  National League 1 (semi-professional)
  Premier 15s (semi-professional)
  National Rugby League (France) - Top 14 
  National Rugby League (France) - Rugby Pro D2
  - Championnat Fédéral Nationale (semi-professional)
  Russian Rugby Championship
  CEC Bank SuperLiga 
  Top12 (semi-professional)
  Extraliga ragby (semi-professional)
  All-Ireland League (rugby union) (semi-professional)
  Ekstraliga (rugby) (semi-professional)
  Super 6 (semi-professional)
  División de Honor de Rugby (semi-professional)
  Welsh Premier Division (semi-professional)
  Didi 10 (semi-professional)
       Rugby Europe Super Cup (semi-professional)
       European Rugby Champions Cup
        European Rugby Challenge Cup

Pro clubs in an amateur league
  Heidelberger RK

Snooker
 World Snooker Tour

Softball

Women's Professional Fastpitch
Athletes Unlimited Softball

 National Softball League
 ESF men's EC club championships
 ESF men's CWC club championships
 ESF Co-Ed Slowpitch European Super Cup

 Japan Diamond Softball League

Table tennis
  China Table Tennis Super League
  Bundesliga (table tennis)
  Ultimate Table Tennis
  T.League
  Egyptian Table Tennis League
European Champions League (table tennis)

Tennis
 Association of Tennis Professionals
 International Tennis Federation
 United States Tennis Association
 Women's Tennis Association
 World TeamTennis

Asia
 International Premier Tennis League (India, Japan, UAE, Singapore)

Champions Tennis League

Track and field
 Diamond League

Ultimate

 American Ultimate Disc League
 Premier Ultimate League

Video gaming/Electronic sports 

Major League Gaming
NBA 2K League
ESL Pro League

ESL Turkey Premiership
League of Legends Championship League

Asia

League of Legends Pro League (top level)

 ESL India Premiership
 Bangalore eSports League
 UCypher (defunct)

Ongamenet Starleague
Global StarCraft II League
League of Legends Champions Korea (top level)
//
League of Legends Master Series (top level)

League of Legends Japan League

MPL Philippines 
PBA ESports Bakbakan 
The Nationals

Southeast Asia
 Garena Premier League (second level)

Multiple regions
League of Legends Championship Series (top-tier, Europe and North America)
Overwatch League (North America, Europe, and Asia)
Halo Championship Series (United States, Europe, Latin America)

Volleyball
  Angola Volleyball League
  Australian Volleyball League
  Australian Women's Volleyball League
  Liga Argentina de Voleibol – Serie A1
  Liga Femenina de Voleibol Argentino
  Bulgarian Volleyball League
  Bulgarian Women's Volleyball League
  Association of Volleyball Professionals (AVP) (beach volleyball)
   Athletes Unlimited Volleyball (AUV)
   Volleyball League of America (VLA)
  National Volleyball Association (NVA)
   National Volleyball League (NVL)
  English National Volleyball League
  English Women's National Volleyball League
   Canadian Volleyball League (CVL)
   National Beach Volleyball League (NBVL) 
  Austrian Volleyball Bundesliga · 
  Austrian Women's Volley League
  Belgium Men's Volleyball League (Euro Millions Volley League)
  Belgium Women's Volleyball League (Liga A)
  Czech Men's Volleyball Extraliga
  Czech Women's Volleyball Extraliga
  Chinese Volleyball Super League (CVL) (both men and women)
  Croatian 1A Volleyball League
  Danish Volleyball League
  Danish Women's Volleyball League
  Dutch Volleyball League· 
  Dutch Women's Volleyball League
  Volleyball Bundesliga der Männer
  Volleyball-Bundesliga der Frauen
  Nemzeti Bajnokság I (men's volleyball)
  Nemzeti Bajnokság I (women's volleyball)
  Enterprise Volleyball League (TVL) (both men and women)
  A1 Ethniki Volleyball (men)
  A1 Ethniki Women's Volleyball
  Israeli Men's Volleyball League
  Israeli Women's Volleyball League
  Proliga (Indonesia)
  Indonesian men's Proliga
  Indonesian women's Proliga
  Prime Volleyball League
  Iranian Volleyball Super League (men)
  Lega Pallavolo Serie A (men)
  Lega Pallavolo Serie A Femminile (women) 
  Male Superior Volleyball League (men)
  Female Superior Volleyball League (women)
  Spikers' Turf (men)
  Philippine Super Liga (women)
  Premier Volleyball League (women)
  Dominican Republic Volleyball League (both men and women)
  V.League (both men and women)
  V.Challenge League (both men and women)
  V-League (both men and women)
  Men's Volleyball Thailand League (men)
  Men's Volleyball Pro Challenge
  Women's Volleyball Thailand League
  Women's Volleyball Pro Challenge
  Volleyball Thai-Denmark Super League
  Pro A (men)
  French Women's Volleyball League
  Romanian Volleyball League
  Romanian Women's Volleyball League
  Russian Volleyball Super League (men)
  Russian Women's Volleyball Super League
  Brazilian Men's Volleyball Superliga 
  Brazilian Women's Volleyball Superliga
  PlusLiga (men)
  TAURON Liga (women)
  Slovakian Men's Volleyball League
  Slovakian Women's Volleyball League
  Slovenian Volleyball League
  Slovenian Women's Volleyball League
  Superliga de Voleibol Masculina
  Superliga Femenina de Voleibol
  Portuguese Volleyball First Division
  First Division Women's Volleyball League
  Montenegrin Volleyball League
  Montenegrin women's volley league
  Divizia A1 (men's volleyball)
  Divizia A1 (women's volleyball)
  Volleyball Vietnam League
  Volleyball League of Serbia
  Serbian Women's Volleyball League
  Elitserien (men's volleyball)
  Elitserien (women's volleyball)
  Swiss Volleyball League· 
  Swiss Women's Volleyball League
  Norwegian Volleyball League
  Norwegian Women's Volleyball League
  Finland Volleyball League
  Finnish Women's Volleyball League
  Tunisian Women's Volleyball League
  Tunisian Men's Volleyball League
  Turkish Men's Volleyball League
  Turkish Women's Volleyball League
  UK Beach Tour
  Ukrainian Men's Volleyball Super League
  Ukrainian Women's Volleyball Super League
 FIVB Volleyball Men's Nations League
 FIVB Volleyball Women's Nations League
 FIVB Beach Volleyball World Tour
 Asian Men's Club Volleyball Championship
 Asian Women's Club Volleyball Championship
 CEV Champions League
 CEV Women's Champions League
 CEV Cup
 Women's CEV Cup
 CEV Challenge Cup
 CEV Women's Challenge Cup
 Baltic Men Volleyball League
 Baltic Women's Volleyball League
 MEVZA League
 NEVZA Clubs Championship
 African Clubs Championship (volleyball)
 Women's African Clubs Championship (volleyball)
 Arab Clubs Championship (volleyball)
 Women's Arab volleyball clubs championship

Water polo

  Australian National Water Polo League
  Bosnia and Herzegovina Water Polo League
  Liga Nacional (water polo)
  Croatian First League of Water Polo
  Championnat de France (water polo)
  Championnat de France (women's water polo)
  Deutsche Wasserball-Liga
  A1 Ethniki Water Polo
  A1 Ethniki Women's Water Polo
  Országos Bajnokság I (men's water polo)
  Országos Bajnokság I (women's water polo)
  Serie A1 (water polo)
  Serie A2 (men's water polo)
  Serie B (men's water polo)
  Serie A1 (women's water polo)
  Maltese Water Polo Premier League
  Montenegrin First League of Water Polo
  Dutch Men's Water Polo Championship
  Dutch Women's Water Polo Championship
  Polish Championship in Water polo
  Portuguese Water Polo League
  Romanian Superliga (water polo)
  Russian Water Polo Championship
  Russian Women's Water Polo Championship
  Serbian Water Polo League A
  Slovenian First League of Water Polo
  División de Honor de Waterpolo
  División de Honor Femenina de Waterpolo
  Elitserien (water polo)
  Türkiye Sutopu 1. Ligi
  British Water Polo League
 Regional Water Polo League (Adriatic Water Polo League)
 Nordic Water Polo League
 Asian Water Polo Clubs Championships
 LEN Champions League
 LEN Euro Cup
 LEN Super Cup
 FINA Water Polo World League
 World Club Water Polo Challenge
 LEN Euro League Women
 Women's LEN Trophy

See also
 List of professional sports leagues in Asia
 List of defunct professional sports leagues
 List of developmental and minor sports leagues
 Major professional sports leagues in the United States and Canada
 List of professional sports teams in the United States and Canada
 List of American and Canadian cities by number of major professional sports franchises
 National Collegiate Athletic Association (NCAA)
 List of sports
 List of sports attendance figures
 List of attendance figures at domestic professional sports leagues
 List of professional sports leagues by revenue
 List of largest sports contracts

References

Professional leagues
 
Multi-national professional sports leagues